Archery was contested at the 2019 Summer Universiade from 9 to 13 July at the Partenio Stadium in Avellino, for the qualifications, and then at the Reggia di Caserta, in Italy.

Participant nations
203 archers from 45 nations participated at the 2019 Summer Universiade.

Medal summary

Medal table

Recurve

Compound

References

External links
2019 Summer Universiade – Archery
Results
Results book

 
2019 in archery
2019 Summer Universiade events
Archery at the Summer Universiade
International archery competitions hosted by Italy